Martti "Masa" Mansikka (born 25 October 1933) is a retired Finnish gymnast. He competed at the 1956 Summer Olympics in all artistic gymnastics events and won a team bronze medal. His best individual result was tenth place on floor. His team placed fourth at the 1958 World Championships. Domestically Mansikka won the Finnish titles on floor, pommel horse and vault in 1957.

References

1933 births
Living people
Finnish male artistic gymnasts
Olympic gymnasts of Finland
Gymnasts at the 1956 Summer Olympics
Olympic bronze medalists for Finland
Olympic medalists in gymnastics
Medalists at the 1956 Summer Olympics